Bandana was an American country music band composed of Lonnie Wilson (lead vocals), Jerry Fox (bass guitar), Tim Menzies (guitar), Joe Van Dyke (keyboards), and Jerry Ray Johnston (drums). After Menzies, Johnston and Van Dyke left, they were replaced with Michael Black and Billy Kemp on guitars, and Bob Mummert on drums. Between 1982 and 1986, they were signed to Warner Bros. Records, on which they charted ten singles on the Billboard Hot Country Singles (now Hot Country Songs) charts, including the top 20 hits "The Killin' Kind" and "Outside Lookin' In". The latter also appeared on a self-titled album.

After disbanding, Menzies assumed the name Tim Mensy. He began a solo career, and later wrote hit singles for other artists. In 2019 his country gospel music CD "His Name is Jesus" was nominated for a Grammy.  Wilson found work as a session drummer. Johnston's son, Jaren Johnston, founded the Southern rock group American Bang, which disbanded and re-established as The Cadillac Three. Jerry Ray Johnston died on January 9, 2022.

Discography

Singles

References

Country music groups from Tennessee
Warner Records artists